The 2022–23 season is the 45th season in the history of Veszprém KC (known as Telekom Veszprém for sponsorship reasons) and their 42nd consecutive season in the top flight. The club is participating in Nemzeti Bajnokság I, the Magyar Kupa, the SEHA League and the EHF Champions League.

Players

Squad information
Squad for the 2022–23 season. 

Goalkeepers
 12  Rodrigo Corrales
 16  Vladimir Cupara
Left Wingers
 21  Bjarki Már Elísson
 26  Manuel Štrlek
Right Wingers
 24  Gašper Marguč
 55  Mikita Vailupau
Line players
 18  Andreas Nilsson
 46  Dragan Pechmalbec
 88  Adrián Sipos

Left Backs
 13  Petar Nenadić
 23  Patrik Ligetvári
 25  Rasmus Lauge (c)
Central Backs
 27  Péter Lukács
 35  Kentin Mahé
 39  Yehia El-Deraa
Right Backs
5  Yahia Omar
 43  Zorán Ilic

Transfers
Source: Rajt a K&H férfi ligában

 IN
 Bjarki Már Elísson (from  TBV Lemgo)
 Mikita Vailupau  (from  Meshkov Brest)
 Dragan Pechmalbec (from  Nantes)
 Yehia El-Deraa (from  Zamalek)
 Gergő Fazekas (from  Veszprém KKFT)

 OUT
 Máté Lékai (to  Ferencváros)
 Jorge Maqueda (to  Nantes)
 Dejan Manaskov (to  Vardar 1961)
 Borisz Dörnyei (to  Dinamo Pančevo)
 Gergő Fazekas (loan to  Wisła Płock)
 Benedek Nagy (loan to  Tatabánya)
 Andrej Pergel (loan to  Tatabánya)
 Blaž Blagotinšek (to  Frisch Auf Göppingen)

Staff members
Source: Staff - Telekom Veszprém 2022/2023

 Head Coach:   Momir Ilić
 Assistant Coach: Péter Gulyás
 Goalkeeper Coach: Árpád Sterbik
 Fitness Coach:   Srđan Žirojević
 Physiotherapist:  Nemanja Vučić,  Dimitar Manevski
 Club Doctor: Zsolt Mahunka MD, Tibor Sydó MD, Péter Szenkovics MD 
 Masseur: József Végh
 Kinesiologist / Fitness coach: Péter Kőrösi
 Video analyst: Csaba Remport

Club

Management
Source: Management

Uniform
Supplier: 2Rule
Shirt sponsor (front): Telekom / tippmix / Duna Group / City of Veszprém / Euronics
Shirt sponsor (back): Duna Aszfalt / VEMÉVSZER / VEB 2023
Shirt sponsor (sleeves): MKB Bank / Viavin
Shorts sponsor: SEAT / Telekom / MKB Bank

Pre-season

Friendly matches

Competitions
Times up to 30 October 2022 and from 26 March 2023 are CEST (UTC+2). Times from 30 October 2022 to 26 March 2023 are CET (UTC+1).

Overview

Nemzeti Bajnokság I

Regular season

Results by round

Matches
The league fixtures were announced on 5 July 2022.

Results overview

Magyar Kupa

Veszprém entered the tournament in the fifth round.

EHF Champions League

Group stage

The draw was held on 1 July 2022 in Vienna, Austria.

Results overview

Statistics

Top scorers
Includes all competitive matches. The list is sorted by shirt number when total goals are equal. Last updated on 2 February 2023.

Attendances

List of the home matches:

References

External links
 
 Telekom Veszprém at eurohandball.com

 
Veszprém KC